Sara Elinor Edwards (born 1963 or 1964) is a Welsh broadcaster. She has been a co-presenter of BBC Wales' early-evening news programme, Wales Today. She is the Lord Lieutenant of Dyfed.

Biography
Edwards was born in Wales and brought up and educated in London, where she studied medieval and modern history.

She started her career with Capital Radio, contributed regular items to BBC Radio Four, and was a continuity announcer and newsreader for HTV West before joining BBC Wales News. She has regularly presented from the Royal Welsh Show and the National Eisteddfod, and has made several series for BBC 2W, including documentaries on rivers, horses, architecture and on the countryside in general.

Her other television work has included presenting Children in Need for the BBC; a series on the Sothebys Welsh Sale; and, in Welsh for S4C, Saith Diwrnod Ar y Sul, a weekly review of world news. She also co-hosted the BBC's Breakfast from Cardiff. In the summer of 2008 she presented the Bryn Terfel Faenol Music Festival and the BBC Wales Arts Review of the Year.

Her interviews for BBC Wales have included Prince Charles, Prince Albert of Monaco, Kyffin Williams, Dame Edna Everage and politicians including Geoffrey Howe, Ann Widdecombe and Dafydd Elis Thomas.

Edwards has also presented a number of radio programmes for Radio Wales, including Sara's People and Food Matters.

Lord Lieutenant of Dyfed
In 2016 Edwards was appointed Lord Lieutenant of Dyfed, the first woman to serve in the role.

Other activities
Edwards is a Commander of the Order of St John and a supporter of St John Cymru Wales. She has presented gold Duke of Edinburgh Awards on behalf of The Duke of Edinburgh at St James's Palace.

Edwards is the Divisional Vice President of the NSPCC in West Wales, and is involved with Cancer Research Wales and the British Heart Foundation. She was previously on the council of the University of Wales, Lampeter and on the board of the Wales Youth Agency.

Personal life
Sara Edwards was 42 when she and her former husband, military historian Lieutenant General Jonathon Riley of the Royal Welch Fusiliers, became the parents of a daughter, born in Cardiff, 19 March 2006. Edwards and Riley divorced in 2017.

References

External links

Sara Edwards at Welsh Stars
Official website

Living people
Alumni of University College London
Welsh journalists
Welsh women journalists
Welsh television presenters
Welsh women television presenters
BBC Cymru Wales newsreaders and journalists
National Society for the Prevention of Cruelty to Children people
Date of birth missing (living people)
Place of birth missing (living people)
Year of birth missing (living people)